Horní Újezd is the name of several locations in the Czech Republic:

 Horní Újezd (Přerov District), a village in the Olomouc Region
 Horní Újezd (Svitavy District), a village in the Pardubice Region
 Horní Újezd (Třebíč District), a village in the Vysočina Region